Jo Yong-in, better known as CoreJJ, is a South Korean League of Legends player who is the support for Team Liquid of the League of Legends Championship Series (LCS). He won the 2017 World Championship with Samsung Galaxy. He was named MVP of the 2020 LCS Summer Split. He received his green card in February 2022.

Tournament results
 1st - IEM Season XI Gyeonggi (Samsung Galaxy)
 2nd - 2016 League of Legends World Championship (Samsung Galaxy)
 2nd - 2017 Rift Rivals (Samsung Galaxy)
 1st - 2017 League of Legends World Championship (Samsung Galaxy)
 2nd - 2018 Jakarta Palembang Asian Games (South Korea)	
 1st - 2019 LCS Spring (Team Liquid)
 2nd - 2019 Mid-season invitational (Team Liquid)
 2nd - 2019 Rift Rivals (Team Liquid)
 1st - 2019 LCS Summer (Team Liquid)
 1st - 2021 LCS Lock In (Team Liquid)
 2nd - 2021 LCS Spring (Team Liquid)
 2nd - 2021 LCS Summer (Team Liquid)
 1st - 2022 LCS Lock In (Team Liquid)

Notes

References

1994 births
League of Legends support players
Living people
Samsung Galaxy (esports) players
South Korean esports players
Team Liquid players